John Felbrigg was one of the two MPs for Ipswich in 1407.

References

Felbrigg